Archduchess Maria of Austria (German: Erzherzogin Maria von Österreich) (Innsbruck, 16 June 1584 – Innsbruck, 2 March 1649) was the daughter of Ferdinand II, Archduke of Austria and his second wife Anne Juliana Gonzaga.  She became a nun.

References

1584 births
1649 deaths
Daughters of monarchs